is a Japanese video game artist and director. She is best known for her work at Tango Gameworks as an artist on The Evil Within (2014) and The Evil Within 2 (2017), and as creative director for Ghostwire: Tokyo before leaving the company mid-development. She also did artwork for Ōkami (2006) at Clover Studio, and Bayonetta (2009) at PlatinumGames. She now heads her own independent game studio, Unseen.

Early life 
Ikumi Nakamura enjoyed horror media with her father growing up. They watched horror films together, and enjoyed playing the Resident Evil and Devil May Cry series, both produced by Capcom. She developed an appreciation for the studio and dreamed to work there when she was older. While studying at university, her father died in a motorcycle accident. His death reinforced her desire to work at Capcom. She attended an art school in Tokyo, and later studied game design at the Amusement Media Academy.

Career

Capcom 
After applying twice, Nakamura was hired by Capcom in 2004. She joined the internal development team Clover Studio and created background art for Ōkami (2006).

PlatinumGames 
Nakamura followed her Capcom colleagues when they left to form PlatinumGames. Early on at the studio, she pitched an idea for an original Nintendo DS game. After Nintendo did not take interest to the project, it was canceled. She served as a concept artist for Bayonetta (2009), and briefly worked on Scalebound as art director before leaving the company.

Tango Gameworks 
In 2010, Nakamura left PlatinumGames to join Shinji Mikami's new studio Tango Gameworks. She served as artist for The Evil Within (2014) and The Evil Within 2 (2017), and as creative director for Ghostwire: Tokyo. Her presentation introducing the game at E3 2019 was widely heralded as a highlight of the press conference for Bethesda Softworks, Tango Gameworks' parent company. However, Nakamura left the project and the company mid-development in 2019 due to her declining health. The stress of developer-publisher politics and the publisher's ultimate control over Ghostwire: Tokyo left her unable to sleep and struggling with daily nightmares.

Unseen 
After leaving Tango Gameworks, Nakamura did consulting and freelance jobs. In March 2021, she announced that she had started a new small independent game studio. The studio, Unseen, was formally revealed the following year. Nakamura expressed her intent for Unseen to create new intellectual properties (IPs) that can function across entertainment media. She also expressed her desire to continue working on games based in mystery, horror, sci-fi, and the supernatural.

Personal life 
Nakamura lives in Tokyo. She had a child in 2020.

Works

References

External links
 
 
 Unseen Inc.

Women video game developers
Video game artists
Living people
Year of birth missing (living people)
Capcom people
Japanese video game designers